Miggybyte was a free disk-based magazine for the Amiga range of computers, published by Pickled Fish Software and edited by Ben Gaunt. From 1995 to 1997 twelve issues were published all being on a single floppy disk only.

The magazine was inspired by Grapevine, the scene-based disk magazine also for the Amiga range of computers, but Miggybyte was not a scene publication.

The publication focused on news about the Amiga, software, games and entertainment. The entertainment section proved to be a main stay of the publication and consisting of jokes and stories from readers. There was even a small classified section and BBS section where many Sysops from around the UK (thought there were a few from the USA too) would publicise their boards.

The interface consisted of two sections, the top part containing the text and in latter version graphics, the bottom the control interface (GUI). The engine behind the publication was called MultiMedia Magazine Creator (MMMC) and was developed by Pickled Fish Software / Ben Gaunt during the time of the publication. A side note here is MMMC was originally a simple text reader designed for the game Maze Madness (F1 Licenceware). MMMC was programmed in the Amiga BASIC language AMOS  and also used the Power Packer library to compress the publication onto a single disk.

Distribution 
Miggybyte was distributed by post, BBS, FidoNet, PD Software Libraries and the Internet, its main distribution being on Aminet and its WHQ BBS Channel X. Two version were released digitally one in LHA (file format) that omitted any copyrighted Amiga, Inc. files and a DMS (Disk Masher System) version that was a full disk image.

See also

Disk magazine
List of disk magazines

References 
  Download page on Crash Tutorial, Ben Gaunt (Editor) talking about Miggybyte.

External links
  Miggybyte on Aminet

Amiga magazines
Defunct computer magazines published in the United Kingdom
Disk magazine
Magazines established in 1995
Magazines disestablished in 1997